Life Eternal is a 2015 Austrian/German black comedy crime film directed by Wolfgang Murnberger.

Cast 
 Josef Hader - Brenner
 Tobias Moretti - Aschenbrenner
 Nora Waldstätten - Dr. Irrsiegler
 Roland Düringer - Köck
 Christopher Schärf - Heinz
 Margarete Tiesel - Maritschi
 Johannes Silberschneider - Nachbar
 Hary Prinz - Pichler
 Saša Barbul - Pinto

References

External links 

2015 black comedy films
2010s crime comedy films
Austrian crime comedy films
Austrian black comedy films
German crime comedy films
German black comedy films
2010s German films